Venetian Works of Defence between the 16th and 17th centuries: Stato da Terra – Western Stato da Mar is a UNESCO World Heritage Site comprising six bastion forts built by the Republic of Venice on its mainland domains (Stato da Terra) and its Domains of the Sea (Stato da Mar).

With the increase in firearm warfare in the Renaissance came significant shifts in military strategy and fort design. One of these changes was the development of the bastion fort, or alla moderna fortifications, with a polygon-shaped fortress with bulwarks at the corners. These designs originated from the Republic of Venice, but would soon spread throughout Europe and remain the standard for defence until the 19th century. In 2017, six of these fortifications in Italy, Croatia, and Montenegro were inscribed on the UNESCO World Heritage list. These six sites provide quintessential examples of this fort design, demonstrate the influence of Renaissance-era Venice, and pay testimony to a major advancement in the history of warfare.

Properties
The sites that make up the World Heritage site demonstrate the breadth of the architectural styles and fortresses employed by the Venetians. Built in the 15th century, the fortified town of Kotor is the oldest site, displaying a transitional period between traditional fortress design and alla moderna design. In the 16th century, the fortifications in Bergamo and the Fort of St. Nikola were built, showing the addition of a more complex and centralized system of bastions, walls, and moats. The defences at Zadar, Peschiera  del  Garda, and Palmanova were completed in the 17th century.

References

See also 
 Bastion fort

World Heritage Sites in Croatia
World Heritage Sites in Italy
World Heritage Sites in Montenegro
Domini di Terraferma
Stato da Màr
Venetian fortifications